La Jetée is a 1962 French science fiction featurette directed by Chris Marker and associated with the Left Bank artistic movement. Constructed almost entirely from still photos, it tells the story of a post-nuclear war experiment in time travel. It is 28 minutes long and shot in black and white.

It won the Prix Jean Vigo for short film. The 1995 science fiction film 12 Monkeys was inspired by and borrows several concepts directly from La Jetée.

Plot 
A man (Davos Hanich) is a prisoner in the aftermath of World War III in post-apocalyptic Paris, where survivors live underground in the Palais de Chaillot galleries. Scientists research time travel, hoping to send test subjects to different time periods "to call past and future to the rescue of the present." They have difficulty finding subjects who can mentally withstand the shock of time travel. The scientists eventually settle upon the protagonist; his key to the past is a vague but obsessive memory from his pre-war childhood of a woman (Hélène Châtelain) he had seen on the observation platform ("the jetty") at Orly Airport shortly before witnessing a startling incident there. He did not understand exactly what happened, but knew he had seen a man die.

After several attempts, he reaches the pre-war period. He meets the woman from his memory, and they develop a romantic relationship. After his successful passages to the past, the experimenters attempt to send him into the far future. In a brief meeting with the technologically advanced people of the future, he is given a power unit sufficient to regenerate his own destroyed society.

Upon his return, with his mission accomplished, he discerns that he is to be executed by his jailers. He is contacted by the people of the future, who offer to help him escape to their time permanently; but he asks instead to be returned to the pre-war time of his childhood, hoping to find the woman again. He is returned to the past, placed on the jetty at the airport, and it occurs to him that the child version of himself is probably also there at the same time. He is more concerned with locating the woman, and quickly spots her. However, as he rushes to her, he notices an agent of his jailers who has followed him and realizes the agent is about to kill him. In his final moments, he comes to understand that the incident he witnessed as a child, which has haunted him ever since, was his own death.

Cast
 Jean Négroni as Narrator
 Hélène Châtelain as The Woman
 Davos Hanich as The Man
 Jacques Ledoux as The Experimenter
 Ligia Branice as Woman From The Future
 Janine Kleina as Woman From The Future
 William Klein as Man From The Future

Production
La Jetée is constructed almost entirely from optically printed photographs playing out as a photomontage of varying rhythm. It contains only one brief shot (of the woman mentioned above sleeping and suddenly waking up) originating on a motion-picture camera, this due to the fact that Marker could only afford to hire one for an afternoon. The stills were taken with a Pentax Spotmatic and the motion-picture segment was shot with a 35 mm Arriflex. The film has no dialogue aside from small sections of muttering in German and people talking in an airport terminal. The story is told by a voice-over narrator. The scene in which the hero and the woman look at a cut-away trunk of a tree is a reference to Alfred Hitchcock's 1958 film Vertigo which Marker also references in his 1983 film Sans soleil.

The editing of La Jetée adds to the intensity of the film. With the use of cut-ins and fade-outs, it produces the eerie and unsettling nature adding to the theme of the apocalyptic destruction of World War III. Terry Gilliam, director of 12 Monkeys, describes the editing as "simply poetic" in the combination of editing and soundtrack that is used in the short film.

As the film plays out as a photomontage, the only continuous variable is the sound. The sound used in this production is minimal, showing up in the form of narration, orchestral score and sound effect. The rhythmic patterns of the soundtrack act as a framework to add to the intensity of the film. "The dissolve is synchronized with the sound. As the story moves from the past to the present, La Jetee creates mental continuity." The soundtrack adds to the illusion of movement within the film and the change of time.

Interpretation
In Black and Blue, her study of postwar French fiction, Carol Mavor describes La Jetée as "taking place in a no-place (u-topia) in no-time (u-chronia)" which she connects to the time and place of the fairy tale. She further elaborates: "even the sound of the title resonates with the fairy-tale surprise of finding oneself in another world: La Jetée evokes 'là j'étais' (there I was)". By "u-topia", Mavor does not refer to "utopia" as the word is commonly used; she also describes an ambiguity of dystopia/utopia in the film: "It is dystopia with the hope of utopia, or is it utopia cut by the threat of dystopia."

Tor Books blogger Jake Hinkson summed up his interpretation in the title of an essay about the film, "There's No Escape Out of Time". He elaborated:

Hinkson also addresses the symbolic use of imagery: "The Man is blindfolded with some kind of padded device and he sees images. The Man is chosen for this assignment because ... he has maintained a sharp mind because of his attachment to certain images. Thus a film told through the use of still photos becomes about looking at images." He further observes that Marker himself did not refer to La Jetée as a film, but as photo novel.

Yannis Karpouzis makes a structuralistic analysis on La Jetée, examining it as an intermedial artwork: Chris Marker creates an "archive" of objects and conditions that have a photographic quality of their own and they are followed by the same predicates as pictures. The dialogue between the media (photography and cinematography) and the filmic signifier (film stills, storyline and narration) is constantly in the backdrop.

Reception and legacy
In 2010, Time ranked La Jetée first in its list of "Top 10 time-travel movies". In 2012, in correspondence with the Sight & Sound Poll, the British Film Institute deemed La Jetée as the 50th greatest film of all time.

In 1963, Prix Jean Vigo awarded La Jetée for "Best Short Film."

In 1963, La Jetée  was part of the Locarno International Film Festival.

In 2009, the film was featured in "Buenos Aires Festival Internacional de Cine Independiente.

La Jetée was featured in the "Cine//B Film Festival" in 2011.

The International Documentary Film Festival Amsterdam had La Jetée as a featured film in 2019.

Science fiction writer William Gibson considers the film one of his main influences.

The video for Sigue Sigue Sputnik's 1989 single "Dancerama" is also an homage to La Jetée.

The film is one of the influences in the video for David Bowie's "Jump They Say" (1993).

Terry Gilliam's 12 Monkeys (1995) was inspired by and takes several concepts directly from La Jetée (acknowledging this debt in the opening credits).

The 2003 short film La puppé is both an homage to and a parody of La Jetée.

The 2007 Mexican film Year of the Nail, which is told entirely through still photographs, was inspired by La Jetée.

The 2018 Spanish film Entre Oscuros Sueños, where is used the still-image movie concept, was entirely inspired by La Jetée.

Kode9 in collaboration with Ms. Haptic, Marcel Weber (aka MFO), and Lucy Benson created an homage to La Jetée in 2011, for the Unsound Festival.

Northern Irish rock band Two Door Cinema Club screened the film at the launch party for their 2016 album Gameshow. The final track on the album, "Je viens de la", is inspired by La Jetée and describes the journey of the film's protagonist.

The film was included in the "1001 Movies You Must See Before You Die" by producer Steven Schneider.

Friend of the World, a two-hander film, was inspired by La Jetée among others.

The Chicago-based band Isotope 217 recorded a track La Jetée for their 1997 album, The Unstable Molecule. On the 1998 album TNT, the post-rock band Tortoise, of which Isotope 217 is a side-project, featured an alternate version of the same song, title Jetty. Both are inspired by the film.

On November 8, 2022 the Chicago Fringe Opera staged a world-premiere concert performance of Seth Boustead and J. Robert Lennon's chamber opera adaptation of the film.

Related media
In 1992, Zone Books released a book which reproduced the film's original images along with the script in both English and French.

Home media
In Region 2, the film is available with English subtitles in the La Jetée/Sans soleil digipack released by Arte Video. In Region 1, the Criterion Collection has released a La Jetée/Sans soleil combination DVD / Blu-ray, which features the option of hearing the English or French narration.

See also
 Filmstrip
 List of films featuring time loops
 The Glass Fortress (similar photomontage style)

References

External links
 
 
 La Jetée at Turner Classic Movies
 La Jetée: The Philosophy of Time Travel, a video essay by William Leese for The Cinematheque
 La Jetée: Unchained Melody, an essay by Jonathan Romney at the Criterion Collection
 Platonic Themes in Chris Marker's La Jetée by Sander Lee at Senses of Cinema
 Retrospecto: La Jetée review by Simon Sellars

1960s dystopian films
1960s science fiction films
1962 films
Dystopian films
Existentialist films
Films about time travel
Films directed by Chris Marker
Films produced by Anatole Dauman
Films set in Paris
French post-apocalyptic films
French science fiction films
French short films
Metaphysical fiction films
Science fiction short films
Time loop films
1960s French films